Kimberly "Kym" Lucas is the eleventh and current Bishop of Colorado in the Episcopal Church.

Biography 
She was consecrated as the eleventh bishop of the Episcopal Church in Colorado on 18 May 2019, at the Cathedral of St. John in the Wilderness. She was elected on the fourth ballot during the diocese's annual convention on 27 October 2018. Lucas is the first woman as well as the first African American to serve as bishop in the diocese.

Prior to her election as bishop, she was rector of St. Margaret's Episcopal Church in Washington, D.C since 2012. Previously, she was the rector of St. Ambrose Episcopal Church in Raleigh, North Carolina, from 2005 to 2011.

Lucas is originally from Spring Lake, North Carolina. She studied science and biology at Wake Forest University, and subsequently at Union Theological Seminary she studied for a master of divinity. Lucas is married to Mark Retherford and has four children.

References

Living people
Year of birth missing (living people)
People from Spring Lake, North Carolina
Wake Forest University alumni
Union Theological Seminary (New York City) alumni
Women Anglican bishops
Episcopal bishops of Colorado